Orange County Fair may refer to any of several large fairs throughout the United States:

Orange County Fair (California)
Orange County Fair (New York)